The 1992–93 season was Blackburn Rovers' 105th season as a professional football club. This was their first year in the Premier League, but it was their first season in the top division since 1966.

Season summary
With the riches of owner Jack Walker allowing manager Kenny Dalglish to sign Southampton striker Alan Shearer for a new British record fee (variously reported as £3.3 million, £3.4 million, or £3.6 million), Blackburn enjoyed an excellent season in their return to the top flight. In spite of Shearer being restricted to only 21 league appearances and 16 league goals after he snapped his right anterior cruciate ligament in a match against Leeds in December, Blackburn finished fourth - just one point off UEFA Cup qualification. Blackburn's cup form nearly saw them qualify for Europe anyway, but they were knocked out of the FA Cup in the quarter-finals and the League Cup in the semi-finals.

Kit
Japanese company Asics manufactured Blackburn's kit this season. British brewery McEwan's Lager were the kit sponsors.

Final league table

Results
Blackburn Rovers' score comes first

Legend

FA Premier League

FA Cup

League Cup

First-team squad

Left club during season

Transfers

In
  Kevin Gallacher -  Coventry City, March, £1,500,000
  Frank Talia -  Sunshine George Cross, August
  Patrik Andersson -  Malmö, December, £800,000
  Stuart Ripley -  Middlesbrough, £1,300,000
  Graeme Le Saux -  Chelsea, March, £700,000
  Nicky Marker -  Plymouth Argyle, £200,000 plus Keith Hill and Craig Skinner
  Henning Berg - Lillestrøm, £400,000
  Lee Makel -  Newcastle United, £160,000

Out
  Lee Richardson -  Aberdeen
  Steve Livingstone -  Chelsea, March, £350,000
  Roy Wegerle -  Coventry, March, £1,000,000
  Keith Hill -  Plymouth Argyle, part-exchange
  Craig Skinner -  Plymouth Argyle, part-exchange

References

Blackburn Rovers F.C. seasons
Blackburn Rovers